Boraboy is a village in the Taşova District, Amasya Province, Turkey. Its population is 732 (2021). Before the 2013 reorganisation, it was a town (belde).

Geography 

Boraboy is a mountain town with a beautiful lake, Lake Boraboy. The settled population was 819 as of 2013.

History and etymology 

Although no written documents exist about ancient Boraboy, there are a few ruins around the town. In a document dated 1257, early Turkmen settlers around Boraboy had been mentioned. According to the town page, the origin of the name Boraboy may either be a certain Bora Bey, a leader of Turkmen tribe or the Greek wind god Boreas. The settlement was declared a seat of township in 1971. Between 1964 and 1994 the town was also called Gölbeyli ("lake lord").

Economy 

Product range in agriculture is quite wide, the most important products being apple, pear and sugar cane. Trout farming and beekeeping as well as flour production are among the secondary activities.

References 

Yaylas in Turkey
Villages in Taşova District